Wah Yan College Cats is a non-profit organization in Wah Yan College, Hong Kong which aims at looking after homeless cats which appeared in the campus of the college. It is the first to adopt the concept of college cats in Hong Kong. The teacher adviser is Ivy Ip Li Lan-Hing. The slogan of the organization is "Respect & Protect Life".

Work

The students in the organization are responsible for looking after the cats every day. Since establishment, the organization has taken care of about 40 cats.  Apart from daily duties, the organization also promotes the message of protecting animals, and periodically writes articles for a cat magazine.

History
Wah Yan College Cats dates back to 1993, when a cat appeared in the campus of Wah Yan College, Hong Kong. It was fed by the students and teaching staffs, and later more cats appeared. The club was made official by the school in 1999, and the organization was temporarily situated in a small underground room below the school canteen.

See also
Wah Yan College, Hong Kong

References

External links
Official Website

Wah Yan
Domestic cat welfare organizations
Animal welfare organisations based in Hong Kong